Robin Kwamina Quaison (born 9 October 1993) is a Swedish professional footballer who plays as a forward for Saudi club Al-Ettifaq and the Sweden national team.

Career
Born in Stockholm to a Ghanaian father and a Swedish mother, Quaison started his professional career in 2011 on loan at Väsby United.

AIK
Quaison joined AIK in 1997. He made his first match for AIK on 1 April 2012, as a substitute in a 0–0 draw against Mjällby. He scored his first goal on 20 May the same year, in a 5–2 victory against IFK Norrköping. His second goal came in the 3–1 win against BK Häcken on 8 July 2012.

He made Europa League his debut in a 4–0 loss to Napoli on 20 September 2012 before going on to playing a further five times in the Europa League cup run. He received the first red card of his career against Halmstads BK in a 3–3 draw. He finished his second season making 28 appearances in all competitions.

On 6 August 2013, Quaison scored a long-distance goal against Manchester United in a 1–1 draw during a pre-season friendly.

Palermo
In July 2014 Quaison moved to the Serie A club Palermo, signing a three-year contract, having been previously linked with Stoke City, Leeds and QPR.

Mainz 05
On 31 January 2017, Quaison signed a 4.5-year contract with Bundesliga side Mainz 05.

On 17 December 2019, Quaison scored his first career hat-trick in a 5–0 Bundesliga victory over Werder Bremen.

On 16 May 2021, Quaison scored the sole Mainz goal, a second-half stoppage time penalty, in a 3–1 Bundesliga loss to Borussia Dortmund, for his thirtieth goal for the club. In doing so, he became the sole all-time top Bundesliga goalscorer for Mainz, breaking a tie with Yunus Mallı and Mohamed Zidan.

Al Ettifaq
In July 2021, Quaison signed a contract with Saudi Pro League club Al Ettifaq.

On 21 August 2021, Quaison scored his first goal for his new club Al Ettifaq in a 3–3 draw against Saudi Arabian side Shabab.

International career
On 23 January 2013, Quaison made his debut for the Swedish national football team, against North Korea in the 2013 King's Cup. Three days later he scored his first goal for Sweden in a 3–0 victory against Finland in the final of the tournament.

In 2015, Quaison was part of the Sweden U21 team that won the UEFA European Under-21 Championship in the Czech Republic. He made four appearances during the tournament, coming on as a substitute in each, and scored one goal in the semi-finals against Denmark.

In 2016, he competed for the Sweden Olympic team at the 2016 Summer Olympics.

In March 2019, Quaison made his competitive Sweden national team debut as he played in the first two rounds of the Euro 2020 qualifiers. Quaison had a successful debut, scoring one goal against Romania in a 2–1 win, and following that up with one goal against rivals Norway in a 3–3 draw. In total, Quaison scored five goals as Sweden qualified for Euro 2020.

Career statistics

Club

International

Scores and results list Sweden's goal tally first.

Honours
Sweden U21
 UEFA European Under-21 Championship: 2015

References

External links

 
 

1993 births
Living people
Swedish people of Ghanaian descent
Swedish footballers
Association football midfielders
Sweden youth international footballers
Sweden under-21 international footballers
Sweden international footballers
Allsvenskan players
AFC Eskilstuna players
AIK Fotboll players
Serie A players
Bundesliga players
Ettan Fotboll players
Saudi Professional League players
Palermo F.C. players
1. FSV Mainz 05 players
Ettifaq FC players
Olympic footballers of Sweden
Footballers at the 2016 Summer Olympics
UEFA Euro 2020 players
Swedish expatriate footballers
Expatriate footballers in Italy
Expatriate footballers in Germany
Expatriate footballers in Saudi Arabia
Swedish expatriate sportspeople in Italy
Swedish expatriate sportspeople in Germany
Swedish expatriate sportspeople in Saudi Arabia
Footballers from Stockholm